James Mullins (born January 11, 1941), better known as Jimmy Velvit, is an American rock and roll singer, who began his career in the 1960s. He is originally from Coalgate, Oklahoma, later from Dallas, Texas. He is best known for recording a white rhythm and blues version, in 1962, of Robert & Johnny's 1958 hit "We Belong Together". Velvit's first release was "Sometimes at Night" on Division Records in 1961, afterwards released on Cub Records (a division of M-G-M). He also recorded under the name 'James Bell', in 1968, when he charted "He Ain't Country", a Country & Western release, for Bell Records.

In 2001, his album Sun Sea and Sand (Seduction SCD-103) was nominated for a Grammy Award. Velvit was still recording and performing .

Discography
45 RPM Singles (listed in alphabetical order by label) (incomplete)

Donna/Her Love – Abnak Records 108 – 1965
That's All I Got From You (with Bobby Hendricks)/I Got A Feeling – Alta Records 108 – 1963
Sometimes I Wonder/My Heart Is in Your Hands – Alta Records 109 - 1963
Woman in Bloom/Let Me Keep Your Love – Bell Records 692 (recorded as Jimmy Velvet) – 1967
He Ain't Country/A Friendly Place To Cry – Bell Records 710 (recorded as James Bell) – 1968
The Pretty Boy/Poor Old Me – Bell Records 45,003 (recorded as James Bell) – 1968
Accused/Come' On John – BI Records 5029 (recorded as Jimmy Velvet)
Love Is Missing/How Sad Chicago – BI Records 5039 (recorded as Jimmy Velvet)
California Good Times/Jack Frost Loving Co. – Blue Records PJ-651 (recorded as Jimmy Velvet)
180% Me/ Let Me Keep Your Love - Bollman International Records 5004 (recorded as Jimmy Velvet) - 1975
Lonely Is Another Word For Me/ Undune, The Arab - Bollman International Records 5014 (recorded as Jimmy Velvet) - 1975
Sometimes at Night/Look At Me – Cub Records  – K9100 – 1961
We Belong Together/I'm Gonna Try – Cub Records – K9105 – 1962
Sometimes at Night/Look At Me – Division Records 102 – 1961
Gotta Lotta Women/I Can't Help It, I Love You – Shane Records 40 – 1963
Wisdom of a Fool/I Want To Be Loved – Startime Records – S-103 - 1964
Don't Go Near A Woman/Hey Nashville - Tear Drop Records TD-3353 (recorded as Jimmy Velvet) - 1977
Drinking Champagne/I Like Her There – Tear Drop Records TD-3383 (recorded as Jimmy Velvet) – 1977
Old Lonesome Me - Detroit City/King Of The Road - Crazy Arms - Tear Drop Records TD-3395 (recorded as Jimmy Velvet) - 1977

Albums
JIMMY VELVET "COUNTRY" –  Tear Drop Records TD 2067 LP (recorded as Jimmy Velvet) – 1977
Bitches I Have Known – Seduction Records SCD-101 CD
Rockin' With Velvit...the 1960s – Seduction Records SCD-102 CD
Sun Sea And Sand – Seduction Records SCD-103 CD
Paranormal Events – Derrick Records DRC-1003 CD
Jimmy Velvit – The Original – Collectables Records COL-5530 CD
The Best of JIMMY VELVIT – Key-Loc Records CD
River Bottom Blues – Seduction Records SCD-131
He Ain't Country – (Jimmy Velvit/James Bell) Seduction Records SCD-128

Compilation albums (albums including at least one Jimmy Velvit track)
Sounds Like Elvis VA, Collectables COL-5700 (Mystery Train & Rockin' With Elvis Tonight)
Big 'D' Rock – Vol One, VA Collectables COL-5553 (Rockin' With Elvis Tonight)
Big 'D' Rock – Vol Two, VA Collectables COL-5554 (Look at Me)
Super Rare Doo-Wops – Vol One, VA (Wisdom of A Fool)
Rare 60's – Collection of Texas Artists, VA Collector's Choice (We Belong Together)
Merry Christmas From Texas VA Texas B Records (I'll Be Home For Christmas/Santa's Got The Blues/Blue Christmas)

CD singles
2000 President Elect Blues – Derrick Records DRC-2000

References

 ARSA Radio Surveys Archive 5/12/62

Sources
Osborne Record Guide (Osborne, Jerry, Fifteenth Edition, 2001)
CD liner notes from "Jimmy Velvit – The Original" Collectables Records, 1995
CD liner notes from "Rockin' With Velvit...the 1960s" Seduction Records, 2000
Dallas Public Library
KBOX Radio Chart/Survey Archives
Dallas Times Herald
Texas Music Industry Directory (published by The Texas Music Office) Office of the Governor, Austin, Texas

Living people
People from Coalgate, Oklahoma
American male singer-songwriters
American bandleaders
Musicians from Dallas
American rock guitarists
American male guitarists
American rock songwriters
American rock singers
American male composers
20th-century American composers
American rhythm and blues singers
American country singer-songwriters
Place of birth missing (living people)
Singer-songwriters from Texas
Bell Records artists
Alta Records artists
Cub Records artists
Tear Drop Records artists
Jimmy Velvit songs
20th-century American singers
21st-century American singers
1941 births
20th-century American guitarists
21st-century American guitarists
Singer-songwriters from Oklahoma
Guitarists from Oklahoma
Guitarists from Texas
Country musicians from Texas
Country musicians from Oklahoma
20th-century American male singers
21st-century American male singers